Jabal An-Nabī Shuʿayb, also called Jabal Hadhur, is a mountain of the Harazi subregion of the Sarawat, located in Bani Matar District, Sanaa Governorate, Yemen. It is the highest mountain in the country and the Arabian Peninsula. It is one of the most prominent peaks in the world, and the third most prominent peak in the Middle East.

Name 
The mountain is named after a prophet called Shuʿayb ibn Mahdam ibn Dhī-Mahdam al-Ḥaḍūrī. According to Islamic scholars, he is different from Shuaib of Midian. According to Al-Hamdani, he was sent to the people of Mikhlaf Hadhur, but they killed him, and God sent Bakht Nasr, who destroyed their town. Locals believe that his tomb is on the mountain. The mountain is also called Jabal Hadhur because it is located in the region of Mikhlaf Hadhur.

Description 
Although its elevation is often reported to be , this is not supported by SRTM data or more recent cartographic sources. The western side of the mountain blocks rain clouds, a rain shadow effect causing that side to be relatively fertile. Atop the mountain is a military post with radar, as well as the purported shrine to Shuaib.

Climbing 
Although the summit is not snow-capped like its counterparts in northern Lebanon and Syria, there have been reports of snow on the peak and frost in the winter. Wind speeds are very high at the summit. In April 2019, Ahmad Zein Al-Yafei, an Emirati security officer from Dubai, claimed that he scaled the mountain in 69 hours, unfurling the banner of the Dubai Police at the peak.

Geology 
The mountain is a prominent part of the tertiary volcanic series, which builds up large parts of the Yemeni highlands. Its rocks were sampled, analyzed and studied in detail by the German mineralogist Dieter R. Fuchs. He elaborated in depth the geochemistry and petrogenetic properties and elaborated a thesis on the formation of this geological series.

See also
 South Arabia
 Geography of Yemen
 Geology of Yemen

References

External links
 Jabal an-Nabi Shu'ayb
 Jabal an-Nabī Shu‘aib, Yemen
 Forecast for Jabal An-Nabi Shu'ayb
 Highest Mountains In Yemen
 Jabal an-Nabi Shu'ayb - The highest mountain
 Village at the base of Jabal an-Nabi Shu'ayb
 اعرف بلدك: جبل النبي الشعيب.. أعلى قمة جبلية في الشرق الأوسط (YouTube, in Arabic)
 أين يقع جبل النبي شعيب
 النزول من جبل النبي شعيب

Nabi Shuayb
Highest points of countries